The Shelag Range, Shelag Ridge is a range of mountains in far North-eastern Russia. Administratively the range is part of the Chukotka Autonomous Okrug of the Russian Federation. The area of the range is desolate and uninhabited except for a few mining areas.

The range was named after the Shelags, a little-known ethnic group that lived on the Arctic coast to the east of Cape Shelagsky.

Geography
The Shelag Range is a northwestern prolongation of the Chukotka Mountains and is the northernmost range of the system. 
Its western end is Cape Shelagsky and Chaun Bay and it is limited to the south by the Ichvuveyem Range, which rises by the Ichvuveyem river, beyond which lie the Chaun Lowlands. To the east the range is bound by the valley of the Keveyem (Кэвеем) river.

Flora
The range has a barren look. At higher elevations there is only rocky mountain tundra. The climate of the area is subarctic.

References

Landforms of Siberia
Chukotka Mountains
ceb:Shelagskiy Khrebet
pl:Szełagskij chriebiet